The Riddler is a DC comics supervillain introduced in 1948.

Geography
The Riddler (Idaho), a mountain

Music
The Riddler aka DJ Riddler an American dance DJ
"The Riddler", a single by Frank Gorshin composed by Mel Tormé 1966 for the original Batman TV series
The Riddler (song)	by Method Man for the 1995 Batman film 
"The Riddler" by Nightwish from Oceanborn and Best of Nightwish
"The Riddler" by Felix Cartal The Joker
"The Riddler" by Elephant9 / Reine Fiske

See also
The Riddle (disambiguation)